Hills Flat is an unincorporated community in Nevada County, California. It lies at an elevation of 2457 feet (749 m).

References

Unincorporated communities in California
Unincorporated communities in Nevada County, California